Elstree & Borehamwood railway station is a railway station in the town of Borehamwood, Hertfordshire, England. It primarily serves Borehamwood as well as the nearby village of Elstree,  to the south-west. Its three-letter station code is ELS.

Elstree & Borehamwood is also the first station down the line that is located outside the Greater London area; however, it is still within London's Travelcard zone area, and is located in Zone 6.

The station is served by Thameslink-operated trains on the Thameslink route.

History
In 1862:
"The London and Midland Junction Railway Bill is here referred to as providing for a new line of Railway into the metropolis. It commences from the Midland Railway at Hitchin, passes by St. Albans, Elstree, Edgware, Finchley and Highgate, and terminates by a junction with the Metropolitan Underground Railway at King's Cross, previously throwing out a Branch to the Cattle Market at Copenhagen Fields."
On 22 June 1863, the Midland Railway (Extension to London) Bill was passed:
"An Act for the Construction by the Midland Railway Company of a new Line of Railway between London and Bedford, with Branches therefrom; and for other Purpose".

Situated north of the Elstree Tunnels, it was built by the Midland Railway as simply "Elstree" in 1868 when it built its extension to St Pancras station. By the 1920s, it had been renamed Elstree and Boreham Wood station. It was modernised in 1959. The station was renamed from Elstree & Borehamwood to Elstree on 6 May 1974, but reverted to Elstree & Borehamwood by mid 1988.

A new footbridge and step-free lifts, installed under Network Rail's Access for All programme, opened on 1 October 2014 in order to make Elstree & Borehamwood entirely step-free.

Services
All services at Elstree & Borehamwood are operated by Thameslink using  EMUs.

The typical off-peak service in trains per hour is:
 2 tph to  via 

See also
Elstree South tube station - unbuilt London Underground station

References

External links

Gallery

Hertsmere
Railway stations in Hertfordshire
DfT Category E stations
Former Midland Railway stations
Railway stations in Great Britain opened in 1868
Railway stations served by Govia Thameslink Railway
1868 establishments in England
Borehamwood